Inborn Pair is a 2011 to 2012 Taiwanese romantic comedy drama television series created and developed by SETTV. It stars Annie Chen and Chris Wang as the main leads, and directed by Golden Bell Award winning director Feng Kai (馮凱). Filming began on November 18, 2011 and debuted on SETTV ETTV on December 13, 2011. Its final episode aired on April 9, 2012 with 84 episodes in total.

Synopsis
Two people who have had a couple of run ins, who never had much luck in love, found themselves betrothed by their families. They give in to a slight hope that because they had drawn the same fortunes, met coincidentally many times, and found one another interesting and attractive, that maybe just maybe they were meant to be. They misunderstand, confuse, frustrate, and hurt each other along the way. Slowly they lay down their fears and mistrust as they grow into a beautiful closeness and genuine fondness for one another. In the end, they believe that they were indeed fated and destined for one another, but the road to happily ever after is indeed a rocky one.

Plot summary
Song Yi Jie (Annie Chen) is a paralegal who is studying to obtain her legal practitioner license. She is a righteous girl who cannot tolerate  the weak being bullied. When she sees an unfaithful husband at her law office refusing to divorce his wife because he wants to keep his good clean image, she volunteered her service by pretending to be his girlfriend in order to obtain evidence against the husband's infidelity.

Ke Wei Xiang (Chris Wang) is the General Manager and runs his family hotel corporation. He mistakes Yi Jie to be a cheater when he meets her at his hotel. The two get off on the wrong foot when she thinks he is a womanizer while he thinks she is a home wrecker. Wei Xiang is actually an obedient son who will listen and do everything his parents and grandmother tells him to do.

The two meet again when they find out they are betrothed to each other over a promise Wei Xiang's grandmother made to Yi Jie's grandfather years ago for saving her life from a robbery. No one agrees to this marriage not even them but in order to make their grandparents happy they hesitantly proceed with marrying each other, but the two eventually fall in love and make their marriage real.

Cast

Main cast
Chris Wang as Ke Wei Xiang
The General Manager of the Weihai Group, including the resort "Animal Planet". Betrothed to Yi Jie while still in the womb by his grandmother. A very considerate and kind person with a strong sense of familial piety and good business sense. Despite his career focused life, he hopes to find a true love. He comes into conflict with Yi Jie before discovering her identity when his plans to expand Animal Planet would require the demolition of the Song family house.
Annie Chen as Song Yi Jie
A legal assistant at a law firm in the process of obtaining her lawyer's license, she is career focused and less concerned with romance. While stubborn and brash, she has a strong sense of justice. Wants to become a lawyer to fulfill a childhood promise to her father who died in a car accident when she was young. Fiercely protective of her family home as the last memories of her childhood.

Supporting Cast
Tan Ai-chen 譚艾珍 as Ke Huang Rui Yin 
Ke Wei Xiang, Ke Wei Cheng and Ke Yan Ni's grandmother. Founder of the Weihai Group. Old friend of Song Jia Bao and architect of the arranged marriage. 
Jennifer Hong 洪小鈴 as Ke Yan Ni 
Oldest child and only daughter of the Ke family. Husband of Wang Ke Fan and friends with Song Yi Jie and Wu Jia Jia.
Xie Kun Da 謝坤達 as Ke Wei Cheng 
Youngest son of the Ke family.
Chris Lee as Wang Ke Fan 
Ke Yan Ni's husband and Deputy Manager of the Weihai Group.
Ai Wei 艾偉 as Ke You Xin 
Ke Wei Xiang, Ke Wei Cheng and Ke Yan Ni's father. 
Yang Chieh-mei as Fang Xue Ru 
Ke Wei Xiang, Ke Wei Cheng and Ke Yan Ni's mother.
Chen Bor-jeng 陳博正 as Song Jia Bao 
Song Yi Jie's grandfather and Song Lin Hao Yun's father-in-law. Old friend of Ke Huang Rui Yin and the man who saved her from robbers.
Yang Li-yin 楊麗音 as Song Lin Hao Yun 
Song Yi Jie's mother and Song Jia Bao's daughter-in-law.
Jenna Wang 王思平 as Luo Yun
Ke Wei Xiang's college classmate and business partner.
Tao Chuan Zheng 陶傳正 as Luo So Sai 
Luo Yun's father and friend to Ke You Xin. President of a business partner to the Weihai Group.
Yin Fu 茵芙 as Wu Jia Jia
Yan Ni and Yi Jie's friend.
Chris Wu 吳慷仁 as Zhao Dong Yang 
Song Yi Jie's college classmate and ex-boyfriend.
Little Bin 迷你彬 as Ke Xiao Sing 
Ke Wei Cheng's illegitimate son.
Puff Guo as Li Er
Li Tian's daughter, Ke Wei Cheng's girlfriend.
Luo Bei An 羅北安 as Li Tian 
A triad boss and Li Er's father.
Chen Yan Zhuang 壯壯/陳彥壯 as Yu Neng Qian 
Ke Wei Xiang's personal assistant.
Lin Xin Bei 林欣蓓 as Jennifer (Ba Zhen) 
Head secretary at Weihai Group.
Xie Qi Wen 謝其文 as Qian Zhen Wu 
Lawyer at Da Tong law firm. Song Yi Jie's boss.
Gao Ying Hsuan 高英軒 as Ceng Jian Ren
Wu Jia Jia's ex-husband.
Darren Qiu 邱凱偉 as Huang Zi Ang
Manager of a construction company partnered with the Weihai Group.
Miao Ke-li as You-Chun (cameo)

Broadcast

Soundtrack
Inborn Pair did not release an official soundtrack. However, there are songs used in the series. In particular, the series had six songs from different artists released in their respective albums. The opening theme song used is "Conductor" (指揮家) by Richie Jen while the ending theme song used is by Mayday entitled "I Don't Want to Leave You Alone" (我不願，讓你一個人).

Track listing

Reception

Inborn Pair received positive reviews from audiences and garnered successful ratings, hitting above the 5.00 rating average on certain episodes. Right after Inborn Pair finished airing, the production team went into development for Sanlih's next romance idol drama. However, hoping to strike double-rating success, they decided to split Chen and Wang up to produce two different new dramas airing back to back on Thursday nights. Annie Chen was paired up with George Hu to film Love, Now, while Chris Wang was paired up with Ann Hsu to film Love Me or Leave Me. Both dramas are from the same writers as Inborn Pair and filmed at the same time. The staff who worked on the series were also split into two team to work on both new dramas since they were produced and filmed at the same time.

Awards and nominations

References

External links
 SETTV Official website
 ETTV Official website 
 Inborn Pair Official Facebook page 

Taiwanese drama television series
Sanlih E-Television original programming
Eastern Television original programming
2011 Taiwanese television series debuts
2012 Taiwanese television series endings
Taiwanese romance television series
Television shows written by Ding-yu Xie
Triad (organized crime)